Rafael Menjívar Ochoa (August 17, 1959 in San Salvador – April 27, 2011 in San Salvador) was a Salvadoran writer, novelist, journalist and translator.

Life 
His father, the economist Rafael Menjívar Larín, was director of the University of El Salvador. When the army occupied it in 1972, during which his father was jailed for a short period, after being exiled in Nicaragua they were forced out in January 1973 towards Costa Rica. In 1976 they settled in Mexico, where Menjívar Ochoa lived for 23 years.  He studied music, theatre and English Literature, and published many books, his first of note being Historia del Traidor de Nunca Jamás, a novel written in 1984 for which he received the EDUCA Latinoamerican award.  In 1990, he won the "Ramón del Valle Inclán" Latinoamerican Award.  In 1999 he settled in El Salvador, where in 2001 he became a Coordinator of Letters (Literature director) and founded the La Casa del Escritor (House of the Writer), a project aimed at providing a formation of young writers, located at the house of Salvador Salazar Arrué. Despite being based in El Salvador he continued to be active in Mexican projects, publishing books there. His widow is Salvadorean poet Krisma Mancía.

Published works
 Historia del traidor de Nunca Jamás (1985), novel
 Algunas de las muertes (1986), poetry
 Histoire du Traître de Jamais Plus (1988), novel
 Los años marchitos (1990), novel
 Terceras personas (1996), narrative
 Los héroes tienen sueño (1998), novel
 Manual del perfecto transa (1999)
 De vez en cuando la muerte (2002), novel
 Trece (2003), novel
 Instructions pour vivre sans peau (2004), novel.
 Un buen espejo (2005), novel
 Tierces personnes (2005)
 Tiempos de locura. El Salvador 1979–1981 (2006), history essay for FLACSO
 Treize (2006), novel translation
 Miroirs (2006), translation
 Cualquier forma de morir (2006), novel

References

1959 births
2011 deaths
People from San Salvador
Salvadoran poets
Male poets
Salvadoran translators
Salvadoran journalists
Salvadoran male writers
Male journalists
Male novelists
Deaths from cancer in El Salvador
English–Spanish translators
20th-century novelists
20th-century translators
21st-century novelists
21st-century translators
20th-century male writers
21st-century male writers
20th-century Salvadoran writers
21st-century Salvadoran writers